The 1999 Nigerian Senate election in Gombe State was held on February 20, 1999, to elect members of the Nigerian Senate to represent Gombe State. Saidu Kumo representing Gombe Central won on the platform of Peoples Democratic Party, while Umar Usman Dukku representing Gombe North and Idris Abubakar representing Gombe South won on the platform of the All Nigeria Peoples Party.

Overview

Summary

Results

Gombe Central 
The election was won by Saidu Kumo of the Peoples Democratic Party.

Gombe South 
The election was won by Idris Abubakar of the Peoples Democratic Party.

Gombe North 
The election was won by Umar Usman Dukku of the All Nigeria Peoples Party.

Replacement 
Idris Abubakar representing Gombe South, died on the 11th of December 2002 and was replaced by Tawar Umbi Wada of the PDP

References 

Gom
Gom
Gombe State Senate elections